Odedara is an Indian surname. Notable people with the surname include:

 Karsanbhai Odedara, Indian politician
 Karshan Odedara, Indian politician

See also
 Odedra

Surnames of Indian origin
Indian surnames
Gujarati-language surnames
Hindu surnames